Anouk Vergé-Dépré (born 11 February 1992) is a Swiss beach volleyball player. She represented her country at the 2016 and 2020 Summer Olympics. Her current partner is Joana Heidrich.

At the 2016 Summer Olympics, Vergé-Dépré and former partner Isabelle Forrer were eliminated in the round of 16 by German pair Laura Ludwig and Kira Walkenhorst.
They finished 9th.

The Pair competed at the World Tour Finals in Toronto 2016 and won Bronze Medal. They won against Larissa Franca and Talita Antunes of Brazil in straight sets of (21–19, 21–18).

At the close of the 2016 season, Vergé-Dépré's former partner, Isabelle Forrer, announced her retirement. Vergé-Dépré then partnered with Joana Heidrich, who was likewise left partnerless upon the retirement of Nadine Zumkehr.

References

External links
 
 Beach Volleyball Swiss Team Website of Swiss Team Forrer/Vergé-Dépré
 
 
 

1992 births
Living people
Swiss beach volleyball players
Beach volleyball players at the 2016 Summer Olympics
Olympic beach volleyball players of Switzerland
Beach volleyball players at the 2020 Summer Olympics
Olympic bronze medalists for Switzerland
Medalists at the 2020 Summer Olympics
Olympic medalists in beach volleyball
Sportspeople from Bern